The Silver Peak Wilderness is located in the southwestern corner of Monterey County in the Santa Lucia Mountains along the Central Coast of California. It southern boundary largely follows the Monterey County/San Luis Obispo County line. Its eastern boundary is defined by Ft. Hunter Liggett, while on the west it follows closely along Highway 1 and the Big Sur coastline. It is one of ten wilderness areas within the Los Padres National Forest and managed by the US Forest Service.

The wilderness was created by the U.S. Congress as part of the Los Padres Condor Range and River Protection Act of 1992 (Public Law 102-301)
The same legislation also established the Chumash, Garcia, Machesna Mountain, Matilija, and Sespe Wilderness areas. On December 19, 2002 the Big Sur Wilderness and Conservation Act of 2002 added  to the existing wilderness. The Wilderness is in two separate units, divided by the Willow Creek drainage and the fire roads to Alder Creek.

Vegetation in the forests includes California sycamore, the big leaf maple, and red alder. Open slopes are dominated by ceanothus, manzanita, coastal live oak, and gray pine. There is also an isolated stand of coastal redwoods, the world's southernmost stand of redwoods. The wilderness also encompasses a rare grove of Sargent cypress, gray pines, and Santa Lucia fir.

In the spring when the creeks fill, some of the steeper canyons feature waterfalls. Salmon Creek Falls, just off CA-1, is a very popular attraction, and the Salmon Creek Trail is a popular access point to the Wilderness. Views on clear days extend to the Big Sur coastline to the north, the Pacific Ocean to the west, and the Salinas Valley to the east.

Recreation includes backpacking, horse camping, and day trips. As with all wilderness areas, motorized and mechanized vehicles (including mountain bikes) are prohibited everywhere except the forest service roads.

References

External links
Wilderness.net: Silver Peak Wilderness
Salmon Creek Falls trail, with photo gallery

Wilderness areas of California
Monterey Ranger District, Los Padres National Forest
Protected areas of Monterey County, California
Protected areas established in 1992
1992 establishments in California
Santa Lucia Range
IUCN Category Ib